Karl Bosl (11 November 1908 – 18 January 1993) was a German regional historian. He held the chair for Bavarian regional history at the Ludwig Maximilian University of Munich from 1960 until his retirement in 1977.

Bosl was elected a full member of the Bavarian Academy of Sciences in 1961, a corresponding member of the Medieval Academy of America in 1970 and of the British Academy the same year. In 1973 he was elected a corresponding member of the Austrian Academy of Sciences .

In 2011, his conduct during the Second World War, including his links with the Nazi government and his claims of having been a member of the German resistance, were examined in a book by Benjamin Z. Kedar and Peter Herde.

References 

Corresponding Fellows of the British Academy
1908 births
1993 deaths
Historians of Germany
Members of the Bavarian Academy of Sciences
Members of the Austrian Academy of Sciences
Academic staff of the Ludwig Maximilian University of Munich